Valchan Chanev (born 15 July 1992) is a Bulgarian footballer who plays as a midfielder for FC Sayana Haskovo.

Career
In June 2017, Chanev was released by Botev Galabovo and joined Third League club Arda Kardzhali.

References

External links 
 

1992 births
Living people
Bulgarian footballers
OFC Sliven 2000 players
FC Haskovo players
Neftochimic Burgas players
FC Botev Galabovo players
FC Arda Kardzhali players
FC Lokomotiv Gorna Oryahovitsa players
First Professional Football League (Bulgaria) players
Second Professional Football League (Bulgaria) players
Association football midfielders
People from Haskovo
Sportspeople from Haskovo Province